Alan Little may refer to:

 Alan Little (academic) (1934–1986), English social scientist
 Alan Little (footballer) (born 1955), English footballer and football manager

See also
 Allan Little (born 1959), former BBC correspondent